The 2016 Bauer Watertechnology Cup was a professional tennis tournament played on carpet courts. It was the 20th edition of the tournament which was part of the 2016 ATP Challenger Tour. It took place in Eckental, Germany between 31 October and 6 November 2016.

Singles main-draw entrants

Seeds

 1 Rankings are as of 24 October 2016.

Other entrants
The following players received wildcards into the singles main draw:
  Florian Mayer
  Yannick Hanfmann
  Jürgen Melzer
  Matthias Bachinger

The following player received entry into the singles main draw with a protected ranking:
  Albano Olivetti

The following players received entry from the qualifying draw:
  Alex De Minaur
  Oscar Otte
  Tim Pütz
  Alexey Vatutin

The following players entered as a lucky losers:
  Kevin Krawietz
  David Pichler

Champions

Singles

 Steve Darcis def.  Alex De Minaur, 6–4, 6–2.

Doubles

 Kevin Krawietz /  Albano Olivetti def.  Roman Jebavý /  Andrej Martin, 6–7(8–10), 6–4, [10–7].

External links
Official Website

Bauer Watertechnology Cup
Challenger Eckental
Bauer Watertechnology Cup